The men's +110 kg weightlifting competitions at the 1984 Summer Olympics in Los Angeles took place on 8 August at the Albert Gersten Pavilion. It was the fourth appearance of the super heavyweight class.

Results

References

Weightlifting at the 1984 Summer Olympics